Calliostoma jeanneae is a species of sea snail, a marine gastropod mollusk in the family Calliostomatidae.

Description
The height of the shell attains 13 mm.

Distribution
This species occurs in the Gulf of Mexico and in the Caribbean Sea off Cuba at a depth of about 250 m.

References

 Clench, W. J. and R. D. Turner. 1960. The genus Calliostoma in the Western Atlantic. Johnsonia 4: 1-80.
 Rosenberg, G., F. Moretzsohn, and E. F. García. 2009. Gastropoda (Mollusca) of the Gulf of Mexico, pp. 579–699 in Felder, D.L. and D.K. Camp (eds.), Gulf of Mexico–Origins, Waters, and Biota. Biodiversity. Texas A&M Press, College Station, Texas.

External links

jeanneae
Gastropods described in 1960